Robert Morris (died 1816), of Barnwood Court, near Gloucester, was an English politician.

He was a Member (MP) for Gloucester 7 August 1805 to 6 September 1816.

References

18th-century births
1816 deaths
Members of Parliament for Gloucester
UK MPs 1802–1806
UK MPs 1806–1807
UK MPs 1807–1812
UK MPs 1812–1818
Members of the Parliament of the United Kingdom for English constituencies